Karel Jarolím (born 23 August 1956) is a Czech football coach and former Czechoslovakia international footballer. As a player, he played as a midfielder and made 275 appearances in the Czechoslovak First League.

Career
Jarolím was the coach of Czech team Slavia Prague. He has been the coach of Slavia three times: In the 2000/2001 season, from 2005 to 2010, and for a he returned for a few games in 2010.

He has also been the coach of Al-Ahli (Jeddah) in Saudi Professional League. He is one of the most successful coaches in the Saudi league for the current season. Al-Ahli is the team with the most goals in season 2011–12 and the second team with the least conceding goals. Also, Al-Ahli (Jeddah) were runners-up in 2012 AFC Champions League final. In May 2013, he signed with Al Wahda for renewable season. He returned to the Czech Republic in January 2014, signing with FK Mladá Boleslav.
On 15 July 2016, Jarolím was hired as manager of Czech Republic national football team. He was sacked on 11 September 2018 after a defeat 5:1 with Russia a day earlier, which was then the highest defeat in the history of the Czech Republic national team.

Personal life
His sons Lukáš and David are also footballers, as well his nephew Marek.

Honours

As a player
 Dukla Prague
Czechoslovak First League: 1978–79.

 Slavia Prague
Intercup: 1986, 1992.

Managerial
 FC Slovácko
Czech Cup Runners-Up: 2004–05

 SK Slavia Prague
Czech First League: 2007–08, 2008–09

 ŠK Slovan Bratislava
Slovak Superliga: 2010–11
Slovak Cup:  2010–11

 Al-Ahli
King Cup of Champions: 2012
Saudi Professional League Runners-Up: 2011–12
AFC Champions League Runners-Up: 2012

 FK Mladá Boleslav
Czech Cup: 2015–16

Individual
Czech Coach of the Year (Rudolf Vytlačil Award): 2008, 2009
Czech Coach of the Year: 2008

Managerial statistics

References

External links 
 Article in Hattrick magazine 
 

1956 births
Living people
People from Čáslav
Association football midfielders
Czech footballers
Czechoslovak footballers
Czech First League players
SK Slavia Prague players
Dukla Prague footballers
FC Rouen players
Amiens SC players
Ligue 2 players
Czech football managers
Czech First League managers
1. FK Příbram managers
SK Slavia Prague managers
1. FC Slovácko managers
Slovak Super Liga managers
ŠK Slovan Bratislava managers
Al-Ahli Saudi FC managers
FK Mladá Boleslav managers
Expatriate football managers in Slovakia
Czechoslovak expatriate footballers
Expatriate footballers in France
Czechoslovak expatriate sportspeople in France
Czech expatriate sportspeople in Slovakia
UAE Pro League managers
Czech Republic national football team managers
Saudi Professional League managers
Czechoslovakia international footballers
Czech expatriate football managers
Sportspeople from the Central Bohemian Region